Wyoming was admitted to the Union on July 10, 1890, and elects United States senators to Class 1 and Class 2. Its current U.S. senators are Republicans John Barrasso (serving since 2007) and Cynthia Lummis (serving since 2021). 21 people have served as a United States senator from Wyoming.

List of senators

|- style="height:2em"
| colspan=3 | Vacant
| nowrap | Jul 10, 1890 –Nov 18, 1890
| After joining the Union, Wyoming did not elect its senators for four months.
| rowspan=3 | 1
| rowspan=2 
| rowspan=5 | 1
| After joining the Union, Wyoming did not elect its senators for four months.
| nowrap | Jul 10, 1890 – Nov 15, 1890
| colspan=3 | Vacant

|- style="height:2em"
! rowspan=2 | 1
| rowspan=2 align=left | Francis E. Warren
| rowspan=2  | Republican
| rowspan=2 nowrap | Nov 18, 1890 –Mar 3, 1893
| rowspan=2 | Elected in 1890.Lost re-election.
| rowspan=4 | Elected in 1890.Lost re-election.
| rowspan=4 nowrap | Nov 15, 1890 –Mar 3, 1895
| rowspan=4  | Republican
| rowspan=4 align=right | Joseph M. Carey
! rowspan=4 | 1

|- style="height:2em"
| 

|- style="height:2em"
| colspan=3 | Vacant
| nowrap | Mar 4, 1893 –Jan 23, 1895
|  
| rowspan=4 | 2
| 

|- style="height:2em"
! rowspan=12 | 2
| rowspan=12 align=left | Clarence D. Clark
| rowspan=12  | Republican
| rowspan=12 nowrap | Jan 23, 1895 –Mar 3, 1917
| rowspan=3 | Elected to finish vacant term.

|- style="height:2em"
| 
| rowspan=3 | 2
| rowspan=3 | Elected in 1895.
| rowspan=18 nowrap | Mar 4, 1895 –Nov 24, 1929
| rowspan=18  | Republican
| rowspan=18 align=right | Francis E. Warren
! rowspan=18 | 2

|- style="height:2em"
| 

|- style="height:2em"
| rowspan=3 | Re-elected in 1899.
| rowspan=3 | 3
| 

|- style="height:2em"
| 
| rowspan=3 | 3
| rowspan=3 | Re-elected in 1901.

|- style="height:2em"
| 

|- style="height:2em"
| rowspan=3 | Re-elected in 1905.
| rowspan=3 | 4
| 

|- style="height:2em"
| 
| rowspan=3 | 4
| rowspan=3 | Re-elected in 1907.

|- style="height:2em"
| 

|- style="height:2em"
| rowspan=3 | Re-elected in 1911.Lost re-election.
| rowspan=3 | 5
| 

|- style="height:2em"
| 
| rowspan=3 | 5
| rowspan=3 | Re-elected in 1913.

|- style="height:2em"
| 

|- style="height:2em"
! rowspan=13 | 3
| rowspan=13 align=left | John B. Kendrick
| rowspan=13  | Democratic
| rowspan=13 nowrap | Mar 4, 1917 –Nov 3, 1933
| rowspan=3 | Elected in 1916.
| rowspan=3 | 6
| 

|- style="height:2em"
| 
| rowspan=3 | 6
| rowspan=3 | Re-elected in 1918.

|- style="height:2em"
| 

|- style="height:2em"
| rowspan=3 | Re-elected in 1922.
| rowspan=3 | 7
| 

|- style="height:2em"
| 
| rowspan=7 | 7
| rowspan=3 | Re-elected in 1924.Died.

|- style="height:2em"
| 

|- style="height:2em"
| rowspan=7 | Re-elected in 1928.Died.
| rowspan=9 | 8
| 

|- style="height:2em"
|  
| nowrap | Nov 24, 1929 –Dec 5, 1929
| colspan=3 | Vacant

|- style="height:2em"
| Appointed to continue Warren's term.Retired when successor elected.
| nowrap | Dec 5, 1929 –Nov 20, 1930
|  | Republican
| align=right | Patrick J. Sullivan
! 3

|- style="height:2em"
|  
| nowrap | Nov 20, 1930 –Dec 1, 1930
| colspan=3 | Vacant

|- style="height:2em"
| Elected to finish Warren's term.
| rowspan=6 nowrap | Dec 1, 1930 –Jan 3, 1937
| rowspan=6  | Republican
| rowspan=6 align=right | Robert D. Carey
! rowspan=6 | 4

|- style="height:2em"
| 
| rowspan=5 | 8
| rowspan=5 | Elected to full term in 1930.Lost re-election.

|- style="height:2em"
| 

|- style="height:2em"
| colspan=3 | Vacant
| nowrap | Nov 3, 1933 –Dec 18, 1933
|  

|- style="height:2em"
! rowspan=10 | 4
| rowspan=10 align=left | Joseph C. O'Mahoney
| rowspan=10  | Democratic
| rowspan=10 nowrap | Dec 18, 1933 –Jan 3, 1953
| Appointed to continue Kendrick's term.Elected in 1934 to finish Kendrick's term.

|- style="height:2em"
| rowspan=3 | Elected in 1934.
| rowspan=3 | 9
| 

|- style="height:2em"
| 
| rowspan=3 | 9
| rowspan=3 | Elected in 1936.Lost re-election.
| rowspan=3 nowrap | Jan 3, 1937 –Jan 3, 1943
| rowspan=3  | Democratic
| rowspan=3 align=right | Harry Schwartz
! rowspan=3 | 5

|- style="height:2em"
| 

|- style="height:2em"
| rowspan=3 | Re-elected in 1940.
| rowspan=3 | 10
| 

|- style="height:2em"
| 
| rowspan=3 | 10
| rowspan=3 | Elected in 1942.Lost re-election.
| rowspan=3 nowrap | Jan 3, 1943 –Jan 3, 1949
| rowspan=3  | Republican
| rowspan=3 align=right | Edward V. Robertson
! rowspan=3 | 6

|- style="height:2em"
| 

|- style="height:2em"
| rowspan=3 | Re-elected in 1946.Lost re-election.
| rowspan=3 | 11
| 

|- style="height:2em"
| 
| rowspan=6 | 11
| rowspan=3 | Elected in 1948.Died.
| rowspan=3 nowrap | Jan 3, 1949 –Jun 19, 1954
| rowspan=3  | Democratic
| rowspan=3 align=right | Lester C. Hunt
! rowspan=3 | 7

|- style="height:2em"
| 

|- style="height:2em"
! rowspan=6 | 5
| rowspan=6 align=left | Frank A. Barrett
| rowspan=6  | Republican
| rowspan=6 nowrap | Jan 3, 1953 –Jan 3, 1959
| rowspan=6 | Elected in 1952.Lost re-election.
| rowspan=6 | 12
| 

|- style="height:2em"
|  
| nowrap | Jun 19, 1954 –Jun 24, 1954
| colspan=3 | Vacant

|- style="height:2em"
| Appointed to continue Hunt's term.Retired when successor elected.
| nowrap | Jun 24, 1954 –Nov 28, 1954
|  | Republican
| align=right | Edward D. Crippa
! 8

|- style="height:2em"
| Elected in 1954 to finish Hunt's term.
| rowspan=4 nowrap | Nov 29, 1954 –Jan 3, 1961
| rowspan=4  | Democratic
| rowspan=4 align=right | Joseph C. O'Mahoney
! rowspan=4 | 9

|- style="height:2em"
| 
| rowspan=3 | 12
| rowspan=3 | Elected to full term in 1954.Retired.

|- style="height:2em"
| 

|- style="height:2em"
! rowspan=10 | 6
| rowspan=10 align=left | Gale W. McGee
| rowspan=10  | Democratic
| rowspan=10 nowrap | Jan 3, 1959 –Jan 3, 1977
| rowspan=4 | Elected in 1958.
| rowspan=4 | 13
| 

|- style="height:2em"
| 
| rowspan=4 | 13
| Appointed to begin the term of Keith Thomson (R), who was elected in 1960 but died before the Congress began.Lost election to finish Thomson's term.
| nowrap | Jan 3, 1961 –Nov 6, 1962
|  | Democratic
| align=right | John J. Hickey
! 10

|- style="height:2em"
| rowspan=3 | Elected to finish Thomson's term.Retired.
| rowspan=3 nowrap | Nov 7, 1962 –Jan 3, 1967
| rowspan=3  | Republican
| rowspan=3 align=right | Milward Simpson
! rowspan=3 | 11

|- style="height:2em"
| 

|- style="height:2em"
| rowspan=3 | Re-elected in 1964.
| rowspan=3 | 14
| 

|- style="height:2em"
| 
| rowspan=3 | 14
| rowspan=3 | Elected in 1966.
| rowspan=6 nowrap | Jan 3, 1967 –Dec 31, 1978
| rowspan=6  | Republican
| rowspan=6 align=right | Clifford Hansen
! rowspan=6 | 12

|- style="height:2em"
| 

|- style="height:2em"
| rowspan=3 | Re-elected in 1970.Lost re-election.
| rowspan=3 | 15
| 

|- style="height:2em"
| 
| rowspan=4 | 15
| rowspan=3 | Re-elected in 1972.Retired and resigned early to give successor preferential seniority.

|- style="height:2em"
| 

|- style="height:2em"
! rowspan=10 | 7
| rowspan=10 align=left | Malcolm Wallop
| rowspan=10  | Republican
| rowspan=10 nowrap | Jan 3, 1977 –Jan 3, 1995
| rowspan=4 | Elected in 1976.
| rowspan=4 | 16
| 

|- style="height:2em"
| Appointed to finish Hansen's term, having already been elected to the next term.
| rowspan=10 nowrap | Jan 1, 1979 –Jan 3, 1997
| rowspan=10  | Republican
| rowspan=10 align=right | Alan Simpson
! rowspan=10 | 13

|- style="height:2em"
| 
| rowspan=3 | 16
| rowspan=3 | Elected in 1978.

|- style="height:2em"
| 

|- style="height:2em"
| rowspan=3 | Re-elected in 1982.
| rowspan=3 | 17
| 

|- style="height:2em"
| 
| rowspan=3 | 17
| rowspan=3 | Re-elected in 1984.

|- style="height:2em"
| 

|- style="height:2em"
| rowspan=3 | Re-elected in 1988.Retired.
| rowspan=3 | 18
| 

|- style="height:2em"
| 
| rowspan=3 | 18
| rowspan=3 | Re-elected in 1990.Retired.

|- style="height:2em"
| 

|- style="height:2em"
! rowspan=7 | 8
| rowspan=7 align=left | Craig Thomas
| rowspan=7  | Republican
| rowspan=7 nowrap | Jan 3, 1995 –Jun 4, 2007
| rowspan=3 | Elected in 1994.
| rowspan=3 | 19
| 

|- style="height:2em"
| 
| rowspan=3 | 19
| rowspan=3 | Elected in 1996.
| rowspan=14 nowrap | Jan 3, 1997 –Jan 3, 2021
| rowspan=14  | Republican
| rowspan=14 align=right | Mike Enzi
! rowspan=14 | 14

|- style="height:2em"
| 

|- style="height:2em"
| rowspan=3 | Re-elected in 2000.
| rowspan=3 | 20
| 

|- style="height:2em"
| 
| rowspan=5 | 20
| rowspan=5 | Re-elected in 2002.

|- style="height:2em"
| 

|- style="height:2em"
| Re-elected in 2006.Died.
| rowspan=5 | 21
| 

|- style="height:2em"
| colspan=3 | Vacant
| nowrap | Jun 4, 2007 –Jun 22, 2007

|- style="height:2em"
! rowspan=9 | 9
| rowspan=9 align=left | John Barrasso
| rowspan=9  | Republican
| rowspan=9 nowrap | Jun 22, 2007 –Present
| rowspan=3 | Appointed to continue Thomas's term.Elected in 2008 to finish Thomas's term.

|- style="height:2em"
| 
| rowspan=3 | 21
| rowspan=3 | Re-elected in 2008.

|- style="height:2em"
| 

|- style="height:2em"
| rowspan=3 | Re-elected in 2012.
| rowspan=3 | 22
| 

|- style="height:2em"
| 
| rowspan=3 | 22
| rowspan=3 | Re-elected in 2014.Retired.

|- style="height:2em"
| 

|- style="height:2em"
| rowspan=3 | Re-elected in 2018.
| rowspan=3 | 23
| 

|- style="height:2em"
| 
| rowspan=3 | 23
| rowspan=3 | Elected in 2020.
| rowspan=3 nowrap | Jan 3, 2021 –Present
| rowspan=3  | Republican
| rowspan=3 align=right | Cynthia Lummis
! rowspan=3 | 15

|- style="height:2em"
| 

|- style="height:2em"
| rowspan=2 colspan=5 | To be determined in the 2024 election.
| rowspan=2|24
| 

|- style="height:2em"
| 
| 24
| colspan=5 | To be determined in the 2026 election.

See also

 List of United States representatives from Wyoming
 List of United States Senate elections in Wyoming
 United States congressional delegations from Wyoming

References

External links
 Wyoming Senators, Representatives on GovTrack.us
 Senators of the 115th Congress, U.S. Senate

 
Wyoming
United States Senators